Swayze Lake is situated in St. Landry Parish, Louisiana, United States. The lake is best known for the disappearance of Bobby Dunbar; the boy was last seen there attending a family fishing trip on August 23, 1912.

References

Bodies of water of St. Landry Parish, Louisiana